Anne Louise Kuljian (born June 17, 1949) is a set decorator. She was nominated for an Academy Award in the category Best Art Direction for the film The Abyss.

Filmography

 The Silence (short) (1982)
 Fatal Games (1984)
 Tuff Turf (1985)
 Runaway Train (1985)
 Native Son (1986)
 Cherry 2000 (1987)
 Stars and Bars (1988)
 A Time of Destiny (1988)
 Heartbreak Hotel (1988)
 The Abyss (1989)
 Flatliners (1990)
 What About Bob? (1991)
 Basic Instinct (1992)
 Clean Slate (1994)
 Now and Then (1995)
 The Crow: City of Angels (1996)
 One Fine Day (1996)
 Sphere (1998)
 Bicentennial Man (1999)
 Remember the Titans (2000)
 Minority Report (2002)
 Equilibrium (2002)
 The Cat in the Hat (2003)
 The Terminal (2004)
 War of the Worlds (2005)
 Mr. Brooks (2007)
 The Mummy: Tomb of the Dragon Emperor (2008)
 Green Lantern (2011)
 Man of Steel (2013)
 Divergent (2014)
 X-Men: Apocalypse (2016)
 Geostorm (2017)
 Mulan (2020)
 The Falcon and the Winter Soldier (2021)

References

External links

1949 births
Living people
Set decorators
People from Los Angeles